See also Pappa polis (TV series) for the TV series based on this novel.

Pappa polis is a Swedish children's novel from 2000, written by Laura Trenter. It is also available as an audiobook.

Plot
This book is about an 11-year-old boy called Julian whose father is a police officer. The father is shot by a bike gang, but survives. But the criminals are going free and the fear remains. As Julian begins to investigate on his own he meets a young man from the bike gang and they become friends...

2000 children's books
2000 novels
Swedish children's novels
Books by Laura Trenter
Children's mystery novels